Anthony Stephen Adams (born 11 December 1940) is a Welsh actor of English and Norwegian descent, known for his performances in two British television soap operas.

Early life
Adams was born on 11 December 1940 in Anglesey, Wales, to Winifred Brown, a sportswoman and aviator. In 1930, she had been the first woman to win the King's Cup Air Race around England.

Adams trained as an actor at the Italia Conti Stage School. As a child, he appeared on the London stage, Other stage appearances included a starring role opposite Cheryl Kennedy in a West End revival of The Boy Friend, and he also appeared on the original cast album released with this production. He also appeared with the Royal Shakespeare Company, and in pantomime with David Essex.

Career
Adams made his name as Dr Neville Bywaters in the 1970s soap General Hospital. He also appeared in the Doctor Who serial The Green Death (1973) as Elgin. However, Adams became ill with peritonitis during filming and some of his lines were given to another character.

In November 1978 he moved on to a role in Crossroads, as accountant Adam Chance, who soon became a major character. It is for this role that he is best known. In September 1987, Adams decided to leave the programme. The announcement was made that the series would end in April 1988, and Adams stayed to the end. He was one of the cast members who returned in the 2001 revival of the series, though his character was later killed off in a fire. He also appeared in a one-off DVD made in 2014.

In late 2004, Adams appeared in the stage version of Chitty Chitty Bang Bang at the London Palladium theatre where he played Grandpa Potts.

Personal life
In 2013, aged 72, Adams began suffering from osteoarthritis, which he speculated might have resulted from eating an excess of seafood, especially prawns.

References

External links 

1940 births
Living people
Actors from Anglesey
Welsh male soap opera actors
Welsh male stage actors
Welsh male television actors
Welsh male musical theatre actors
20th-century Welsh male actors
21st-century Welsh male actors
Alumni of the Italia Conti Academy of Theatre Arts